Pilbara Iron is a wholly owned subsidiary of the multinational Rio Tinto Group, that manages assets for Hamersley Iron Pty Ltd, a wholly owned subsidiary of Rio Tinto, and Robe River Iron Associates, an unincorporated joint venture between Rio (53% and operator since 2000) and three Japanese steel companies Mitsui Iron Ore Development P/L (33%), Nippon Steel Australia P/L (10.5%) and Sumitomo Metal Australia P/L (3.5%).

All of these companies are involved in the mining of iron ore, predominantly from the Pilbara region of Western Australia.

In 2004, Rio Tinto announced that Robe and Hamersley would start merging operations under the new Pilbara Iron entity. The concept had been tested by the formation of Pilbara Rail in 2001, which generated more than $16 million in savings. Pilbara Rail was folded into Pilbara Iron in 2005. Each company continues to market products separately and retains ownership and profits from the underlying mines, as well as strategic development of their own mineral resources.

Current mine sites
Mine sites currently operating:
 Brockman 4 mine (2010)
 Mesa A mine (2010)
 Hope Downs mine (2007)
 Hope Downs 4 mine (2014)
 Eastern Range mine (2004)
 Nammuldi mine (2003)
 West Angelas mine (2002)
 Yandicoogina mine (1998)
 Mesa J mine (1994)
 Marandoo mine (1994)
 Brockman mine (1992)
 Channar mine (1990)
 Paraburdoo mine (1972)
 Mount Tom Price mine (1966)

All iron ore mined at the sites is transported on the Hamersley & Robe River railway, one of the world's largest privately owned railroads to either the port of Dampier, Western Australia or Cape Lambert near Wickham, Western Australia. From there the ore is shipped across the world, with China and Japan the largest markets as of 2007.

Historical events
 May 1967 – Hamersley Holdings Limited shares list on the ASX
 May 1974 – Hamersley Europe Pty. Limited incorporated

Film Red Dog
The film Red Dog, based on stories about an actual wandering dog of the Pilbara region, was made at Hamersley Iron locations.

See also

 Pilbara historical timeline
 Pilbara newspapers

References

External links 

Rio Tinto Iron Ore Official website

Mining companies of Australia
Companies based in Perth, Western Australia
Pilbara
Rio Tinto Iron Ore